Unamuno often refers to Miguel de Unamuno (1864–1936), Spanish essayist, novelist, and poet.

Unamuno may also refer to:

 Pedro de Unamuno (fl. 1580s), Spanish soldier and sailor
 Ramón Unamuno (1907—1973), Ecuadorian footballer and coach
 Rebecca De Unamuno, Australian actress and comedian
 Victorio Unamuno (1909–1988), Spanish footballer

See also